Nullarbor Wilderness Protection Area is a protected area in the Australian state of South Australia located about  west of Ceduna in the locality of Nullarbor. 

The wilderness protection area was proclaimed under the Wilderness Protection Act 1992 on 6 June 2013 on land previously proclaimed under the National Parks and Wildlife Act 1972 as the Nullarbor National Park and the Nullarbor Regional Reserve.

It is bounded in the west by the Western Australia - South Australian state border, in the south by the coastline adjoining the Great Australian Bight, to the east by the Yalata Indigenous Protected Area and the Nullarbor Regional Reserve, and to the north by the Nullarbor National Park and the Nullarbor Regional Reserve.

Two heritage-listed sites within the area, Koonalda Cave and the Koonalda Homestead Complex, are listed on the South Australian Heritage Register; the former is also listed on the Australian National Heritage List.

The wilderness protection area is classified as an IUCN Category Ib protected area.

See also
Murrawijinie Cave

References

External links
Nullarbor Wilderness Protection Area webpage on the Protected Planet website

Wilderness areas of South Australia
Protected areas established in 2013
2013 establishments in Australia
Nullarbor Plain